Scearctia is a monotypic moth genus in the subfamily Arctiinae described by Hering in 1925. Its single species, Scearctia figulina, first described by Arthur Gardiner Butler in 1877, is found in Brazil.

References

Arctiinae